Spice Girls: Giving You Everything is a 2007 British documentary film released to coincide with the 2007 reunion tour of the British all-female pop group the Spice Girls.

Summary
The documentary is centred on the Spice Girls and their creation, rise to fame, exit of member Geri Halliwell, break-up and reunion. The film features narrative insight and commentary from the five girls themselves. The title of the documentary comes from chorus lyrics from the group's UK number one single "Say You'll Be There".

Directed by Bob Smeaton, the documentary made its world première in Australia on FOX8 on Sunday, 16 December 2007 at 7:30pm. It later aired in Canada on 19 December 2007 (on the CTV), in New Zealand on 24 December 2007 and on the BBC in the United Kingdom on 31 December 2007.

Viewership
The film attracted 3.6 million viewers in the UK, overnight figures suggest. It came second in the timeslot, losing out only to popular soap opera Coronation Street on ITV.

Cast
 Geri Halliwell
 Mel B
 Emma Bunton
 Melanie C
 Victoria Beckham

Crew
 Director: Bob Smeaton
 Executive producer: Robert Massie
 Editor: Damien O' Neill
 Programme executive: Nicki Chapman
 Production manager: Alexandria Pickering
 Post sound: Dave Hayes
 Archive producer: Julian Adamoli
 Head of production: Martha Brass
 Production co-ordinator: Gillian Bristow
 Online editor: Connan McStay

See also
 Spice Girls filmography

External links

2007 television films
2007 films
British documentary films
Works about the Spice Girls
Documentary films about entertainers
2007 documentary films
Documentary films about women in music
2000s British films